Tral is a town, sub-district and a notified area committee in the Pulwama district of Indian-administered Kashmir. Tral is the second largest area committee in Pulwama district.

History
Gufkral represents an important site in the area. Gufkral is located at Banmir village in Hurdumir area of Tral,  from the sub district headquarter. The area falls between two nallahs (streams) on an extensive deposit of Karewa (elevated table-land) where people used to live in ancient times.

Geography

The main town area of Tral is divided into two parts/divisions – Upper Tral (Tral-i-Bala) and Lower Tral (Tral-i-Payeen). There is a significant difference in the altitudes of these two divisions/parts as their name suggests. The population of Lower Tral (Tral-i-Payeen) is more than that of Upper Tral (Tral-i-Bala).

Villages in Tral Tehsil 

 Ali Gund
 Amirabad
 Amlar
 Arigam Ullar
 Aripal
 Baragam
 Batagund
 Brental
 Bathnoor Jagir
 Begh Gund
 Boochu
 Chandrigam
 Chatrugam
 Chewa Ullar
 Cheribugh
 Dadasara
 Dar Ganie Gund
 Deedarpora
 Dewar
 Dharamgund
 Doonigund
 Gameraj
 Gutroo
 Gulab Bagh
 Gulistan
 Gulshanpora
 Gwaang
 Hajinar
 Hurdumir
 Heewan
 Jawahirpora
 Khanagund (Midoora)
 Khasipora
 Kuchmulla
 Nader
 Lalgam
 Lalpora
 Laribal
 Lariyar
 Lurgam
 Lurow Jagir
 Machhama
 Mandoora
 Monghama
 Naher
 Nigeenpora
 Naibugh
 Nanner
 Nawdal
 Nazneenpora
 Nargistan
 Panner Jagir
 Panzoo
 Pethgam Gadpora
 Pinglish
 Pranigam
 Quil Shikargah
 Rathsuna
 Reshipora
 Syedabad
 Sangrama
 Seer Jagir
 Shahpora
 Sheerabad
 Saimoh
 Satoora
 Takiya Gulab Bagh
 Wagad
 Kaarmulla

Demographics
As of 2011 Indian Census, Tral had a population of 1,10,196 with 57,536 males constituting 52.21% of the population and 52,660 females constituting 47.79% of the population. Out of 1,10,196, 17,844 is urban and 92,352 is rural population of Tral.

Religion

According to the 2011 census, Islam is practised by about 89.51% of the population, while 7.41% follow Sikhism and 2.48% follow Hinduism.

Education
Tral has an average literacy rate of about 64%. There are various educational institutions in and around Tral town. Tral has two educational zones:- Zone Tral and Zone Lurgam which consist of 201 government educational institutes and  33 private schools up to senior secondary level besides a degree college, an Islamic College for females namely Islamic Oriental College and an Industrial Training Institute.

Tourist attractions
Nagaberan (Upper Dachigam), Wasturwan (Syedabad), Gufkral, Shikargah, Panner Dam, Aripal Spring, Narastan, Hajan and Dilnag are the main tourist attractions of Tral. Tarsar-Marsar lakes are also accessible via the meadows of Nagaberan.

Tral Wildlife Sanctuary
On 26 October 2019, the government declared a new breeding ground for endangered Kashmiri stag (Hangul) in Tral area.

Security situation 
Tral is a volatile area and a traditional hotbed of militancy. Burhan Wani, former commander of Hizbul Mujahideen, hailed from Dadasara Tral. Hizbul Mujahideen commander Sabzar Bhat, successor of Burhan Wani, also hailed from Rathsuna Tral and was killed in Saimoh village (Tral) by Indian security forces, thus sparking days of unrest. Ansar Ghazwat-ul-Hind (Kashmir based Al-Qaeda Cell) is also believed to be operated from Tral as its founder and chief, Zakir Musa, hailed from Noorpora area of Tral.

Notable people
Notable people living in or coming from the Tral area include:

 Ali Muhammad Naik – former MP, MLA, speaker of Legislative Assembly.
 Maulana Noor Ahmad Trali – a Religious Scholar. 
 Burhan Wani – a Hizbul Mujahideen militant.

References

Cities and towns in Pulwama district